The 2013 African Badminton Championships or African Badminton Cup of Nations was held in Rose Hill, Mauritius between 14-20 August and organised by the Badminton Confederation of Africa.

Medalists

Medal table

References

External links 
 Individual Result
 Team Result

African Badminton Championships
2013 in African sport
Badminton tournaments in Mauritius
African Badminton Championships